The Döllnitz is a river of Saxony, Germany. It flows through the towns Mügeln and Oschatz, and joins the river Elbe in Riesa.

See also
List of rivers of Saxony

Rivers of Saxony
Rivers of Germany